Bernal Heights Journal
 Bernal Heights Pictorial
 Bernal Journal
 New Bernal Journal
 The Bernal Journal
 Mission News
 New Mission News
 North Mission News
 El Tecolote
 Glen Park Association Newsletter
 Glen Park News
 Glen Park Perspective
 Marina Times
 Nob Hill Gazette 
 Noe Valley Voice
 The Noe Valley Voice
 OMI News
 Ingleside-Excelsior Light
 Potrero View
 The Potrero View
 Richmond ReView
 The Richmond ReView
 Sunset Beacon
 West of Twin Peaks Observer
 West Portal Monthly
 St. Mary's Park Bell
 Street Art News
 Telegraph Hill Bulletin
 Telegraph Hill Semaphore
 The Semaphore
 The Telegraph Hill Semaphore
 Tenant Times
 Central City Extra
 Tenderloin Times
 The New Fillmore
 Visitacion Valley Grapevine
 San Francisco Bay View
 Hoodline
 Mission Local
 48 Hills
 Beyond Chron
 San Francisco Standard
 San Francisco Public Press
 Sing Tao Daily San Francisco
 San Francisco Independent Journal
 San Francisco Business Times
 The Street Sheet
 The Bold Italic

References 

Newspapers published in the San Francisco Bay Area
Companies based in San Francisco
Newspapers published in San Francisco
Mass media in the San Francisco Bay Area
American news websites